Emanuel Quint (1930-2018) was a rabbi, lawyer and author of the ten volume A Restatement of Rabbinic Civil Law, parts of which have been serialized in The Jewish Press.

He was the dean and Rosh Kollel of the Jerusalem Institute of Jewish Law, which he co-founded with Rabbi Adin Steinsaltz.

References

20th-century rabbis in Jerusalem
21st-century rabbis in Jerusalem
1930 births
2018 deaths